Gagliano Castelferrato (Latin: Galaria; Sicilian: Gagghianu) is a comune in Sicily, Italy in the Province of Enna.

References

Municipalities of the Province of Enna